Samuel Warren Branch House, also known as Branch Grove, is a historic plantation house located near Enfield, Halifax County, North Carolina. It dates to the late-1840s, and is a tripartite Federal-style frame dwelling with an attached Georgian-style cottage.

It was listed on the National Register of Historic Places in 1982.

References

Plantation houses in North Carolina
Houses on the National Register of Historic Places in North Carolina
Georgian architecture in North Carolina
Federal architecture in North Carolina
Houses in Halifax County, North Carolina
National Register of Historic Places in Halifax County, North Carolina